Avonmouth railway station was the terminus of the Bristol Port Railway and Pier, a self-contained railway which ran along the River Avon in Bristol, England. The station, which opened in 1865, was adjacent to a pier on the River Severn at Avonmouth. It had two platforms and an adjacent hotel, as well as an engine shed and water tank. The station was closed in 1902 as the land was required for the expansion of Avonmouth Docks, although it remained in use for workers' trains until 1903. The hotel continued in operation until 1926, when it too was demolished to make way for the docks. The station site is now in the middle of Avonmouth Docks.

History

Construction 
The station was opened on 6 March 1865 when services began on the Bristol Port Railway and Pier (BPRP), a self-contained railway owned by the Bristol Corporation. The line ran along the north bank of the River Avon in Bristol, England, to a deep water pier on the Severn Estuary at Avonmouth. Avonmouth had two tracks, aligned roughly north–south, with a platform on either side. The eastern platform had a booking office, and was connected by a path to the neighbouring Avonmouth Hotel. A gate led to a pontoon and floating bridge across to a -long pier, which opened on 3 June 1865. The western platform fell out of use early in the station's operation. The station also had an engine shed and water tank.

Operation and closure 
The BPRP ran into trouble by 1871 when the terminal pier at Avonmouth became difficult to use due to a build-up of silt. With no prospect of a proper dock being funded without a connection to the national rail network, the Clifton Extension Railway (CER) was approved. This was a joint venture by the BPRP, Great Western Railway and Midland Railway. The new line opened in 1877, but passenger trains from the national network terminated at Clifton Down as the link from Clifton to Sneyd Park Junction was not cleared for passenger use until 3 August 1878. Even after services were allowed to run, the Midland and Great Western Railways did not think the BPRP track was in a suitable condition and so refused to run any passenger trains beyond Clifton Down. Despite the increased traffic the BPRP suffered financially, and was taken over by the CER in 1890.

The expansion of Avonmouth Docks, and particularly the construction of Royal Edward Dock, led to the closure of Avonmouth station, as the land was required for construction. Services for the general public were withdrawn on 1 October 1902, but the station was used for unadvertised workers' trains until 15 May 1903, with the official closure the following day. After the closure of the station, all trains terminated at Avonmouth Dock. The station site is now in the middle of Avonmouth Docks.

The Avonmouth Hotel 
When the station opened, the surrounding area was almost entirely rural, and would remain so throughout the station's existence. Indeed, in 1902, John L Dunk wrote in The Railway Magazine that he could not think why trains ran only to an inn and a few cottages. The gardens boasted a concert hall, as well as an ornamental lake, and hosted fêtes at Easter and Whitsun. Despite excursion trains to the gardens, they were not viable financially.

The hotel remained in business after the station's closure, albeit isolated from public transport. It provided accommodation for many Europeans emigrating to the Americas via Avonmouth, and during the First World War it housed the Women's Army Auxiliary Corps. It was finally demolished in 1926 when the Royal Edward Dock was expanded.

See also 
Avonmouth railway station (disambiguation)

Notes

References 

Former Great Western Railway stations
Former Midland Railway stations
Railway stations in Great Britain opened in 1865
Railway stations in Great Britain closed in 1903
Disused railway stations in Bristol
Avonmouth
Bristol Port Railway and Pier